Petter's sportive lemur (Lepilemur petteri) is a sportive lemur endemic to Madagascar. It is one of 26 species in the genus Lepilemur. Petter's sportive lemur is found in southwestern Madagascar, living in dry spiny forests and some gallery forests.

References

Sportive lemurs
Mammals described in 2006